Luca Napolitano (born 5 May 1986 in Avellino, Italy) is an Italian singer-songwriter.

Career 
In 2008, he joined to the eighth edition of the Italian talent show Amici di Maria De Filippi, after four years of trying. He reached the final stage and he finished in third place. He signed a contract with Warner Music and he released in 2009 his first EP Vai. The EP was certified gold and it reached the #5 in the Italian singles chart. He released from the album three singles with a great success: Vai (#9 Italy), Forse forse (#5 Italy) and Da quando ti conosco.

In October, he released his first studio album L'infinito. The album reached the #16 in Italian chart and was certified gold.
In May 2010, he was awarded to the "Wind Music Awards" for the sales of his first record Vai. In the summer he was busy with L'infinito Tour for promoting the album. In October, he released a new single A Sud Di NY (featuring Federica Camba). The song has anticipated the release of the EP Di Me that debuted at #16 in the chart.

Discography

Albums/Ep's

Singles

Filmography 
A Sud di New York (2010, Directed by Elena Bonelli)

1986 births
Living people
Italian singer-songwriters
21st-century Italian singers